Arthur Mahaffey Jr. (born June 4, 1938) is an American former professional baseball starting pitcher, who played in Major League Baseball (MLB) for the Philadelphia Phillies (–) and St. Louis Cardinals. He batted and threw right-handed. In a seven-season MLB career, Mahaffey posted a 59–64 record, with 639 strikeouts, and a 4.17 earned run average (ERA), in 999.0 innings pitched.

Mahaffey was signed as an amateur free agent by the Philadelphia Phillies on June 29, 1956, out of Western Hills High School (Cincinnati, Ohio). He began his Minor League Baseball career that summer. After 4 seasons playing in the Phillies' farm system, he received his MLB call-up, playing in his first Phillies game on July 30, 1960; Mahaffey pitched the final two innings of a game against the St. Louis Cardinals. He retired the three batters he faced in the eighth inning. In the ninth, Bill White led off with a single to right field and then was picked off by Mahaffey at first base. The next batter, Curt Flood, singled to center field, and he, too, was picked off by Mahaffey, who threw to first with Flood tagged out on a throw from first to second. He finished the  season with a 7–3 record, an ERA of 2.31, 14 games played, while finishing third in the 1960 National League (NL) Rookie of the Year balloting (which was won by Frank Howard of the Los Angeles Dodgers).

Mahaffey set a club record with 17 strikeouts in a game against the Chicago Cubs on April 23, 1961. Though he ended the  season with an ERA of 4.10, and a record of 11–19 (leading the NL in losses), in 36 games, he was selected to represent the Phillies on the NL All-Star team. Mahaffey ended the  season with a record of 19–14, and a 3.94 ERA, with a career high 177 strikeouts, in 41 games. He was selected again in 1962 for the NL All-Star team, finishing 26th in balloting for NL Most Valuable Player (MVP), despite leading the league in home runs allowed with 36, and earned runs allowed with 120. Mahaffey had a 7–10 record in 26 games with the  Phillies, to go along with a 3.99 ERA. In , he finished the season with a record of 12–9, with an ERA of 4.52, in 34 games. The ill-fated 1964 team was in first place in the NL, with a 6-game lead, with just 12 games remaining in the season, before starting a 10-game losing streak that cost the team the pennant. Mahaffey pitched in two of the games in that infamous skid, losing a 1–0 game (the first of that losing streak) on a steal of home by Chico Ruiz of the Cincinnati Reds, and was taken out while winning 4-3 in a game against the Milwaukee Braves, in which Rico Carty hit a ninth-inning bases-loaded triple, plating all 3 runners, off of reliever Bobby Shantz, to win the game for the Braves, 6-4.  was his last season in Philadelphia, which saw him finish with a 2–5 record, and an ERA of 6.21, in 22 games, mostly in relief.

Mahaffey was traded by the Phillies on October 27, 1965, along with catcher Pat Corrales, and outfielder Alex Johnson, to the Cardinals, in exchange for shortstop Dick Groat, catcher Bob Uecker, and first baseman Bill White. In his only season with the Cards, he had a 1–4 record, in 12 games, with an ERA of 6.43.

Mahaffey was dealt along with Jerry Buchek and Tony Martínez from the Cardinals to the New York Mets for Ed Bressoud, Danny Napoleon and cash on April 1, 1967. Mahaffey would never play for the Mets.

As of 2014, Mahaffey resides in Allentown, Pennsylvania.

Highlights
Two time All-Star (1961–62)
Picked off the first three players who had base hits against him: Curt Flood and Bill White of the St. Louis Cardinals (July 30, 1960) and Jim Marshall of the San Francisco Giants (July 31, 1960).
On April 23, 1961, struck out 17 Chicago Cubs to set a Phillies team record. He also tied the since-broken National League record for most strikeouts in a day game.
In 1962, Mahaffey became the last pitcher to strike out at least 12 batters and hit a grand slam in a game.

References

External links

Art Mahaffey at SABR (Baseball BioProject)
Art Mahaffey at Baseball Almanac
Art Mahaffey at Baseballbiography.com

1938 births
Living people
Baseball players from Cincinnati
Buffalo Bisons (minor league) players
Dallas–Fort Worth Spurs players
High Point-Thomasville Hi-Toms players
Jacksonville Suns players
Major League Baseball pitchers
Mattoon Indians players
Mattoon Phillies players
National League All-Stars
Philadelphia Phillies players
St. Louis Cardinals players
Salt Lake City Bees players
Tulsa Oilers (baseball) players
Williamsport Grays players